The Gulf of Valencia, is a gulf or inlet of the western Mediterranean Sea, on the eastern coast of Spain. Its limits are the Cap de la Nau headland in the south, while the northern limit is diffuse: for some it is the Cape of Vinaròs; and for others it is  the Ebre Delta. When the Cape of Vinaròs is used the Gulf of Valencia's coast is entirely within the Valencian Community. When the Ebre Delta is used its northern coast is within southern Catalonia.

The tiny Columbretes islets are located in the gulf. The Gulf of Valencia is bisected by the Prime Meridian.

Geography
The coast along the Gulf of Valencia is typically a sandy plain with beaches.   The distinctive shoreline features in this region are the coastal marshes, with the Albufera estuary an example. It is a Ramsar Convention listed wetland of importance.

The gulf area is among the finest examples of the Mediterranean climate in Spain.  The coast along the Gulf of Valencia is densely populated, with one of the highest population densities in Spain.

Uses
Adjacent are low and fertile lands, with rice and especially citrus trees producing oranges and lemons, as the dominant crops.

There are environmental concerns about offshore drilling here.

See also
Valencian Community
Balearic Islands

References

Gulfs of the Mediterranean
Coasts of Spain
Gulfs of Spain
Landforms of the Valencian Community
Landforms of Catalonia